Nicholas de Pencier is a Canadian cinematographer and filmmaker. The spouse and professional partner of filmmaker Jennifer Baichwal in Mercury Films, he is the cinematographer and producer on most of her films as well as codirector of the films Long Time Running. and Anthropocene: The Human Epoch. He was also solo director of the 2016 documentary Black Code.

He won a Genie Award in 2007, alongside Baichwal, Gerry Flahive, Daniel Iron and Peter Starr for Manufactured Landscapes and a Canadian Screen Award in 2011 alongside Baichwal, Iron and Edward Burtynsky for Watermark, and was an Emmy Award nominee for Outstanding Nature Programming in 2010 for "The Incredible Journey of the Butterflies", an episode of Nova.

Personal life
He is the son of magazine publisher Michael de Pencier, and the brother of film and television producer Miranda de Pencier.

Filmography

Let It Come Down: The Life of Paul Bowles (1998) - cinematographer, producer
The Uncles (2000) - producer
The Holier It Gets (2000) - cinematographer, producer
The True Meaning of Pictures: Shelby Lee Adams' Appalachia (2002) - cinematographer, producer
Manufactured Landscapes (2006) - cinematographer, producer
One Week (2008) - producer
Act of God (2009) - cinematographer, producer
Payback (2012) - cinematographer
The End of Time (2012) - cinematographer
Watermark (2013) - producer, cinematographer
The Ghosts in Our Machine (2013) - cinematographer
Al Purdy Was Here (2015) - cinematographer
Black Code (2016) - director, producer
Long Time Running (2017) - director, editor
Anthropocene: The Human Epoch (2018) - director, producer, cinematographer
Into the Weeds (2022) - producer, cinematographer

References

External links

Official biography, Mercury Films website

Canadian documentary film producers
Canadian documentary film directors
Canadian cinematographers
Canadian film editors
Living people
Film directors from Toronto
Year of birth missing (living people)
Best Cinematography in a Documentary Canadian Screen Award winners
Canadian Film Centre alumni
Canadian film production company founders
Film producers from Ontario